The Ministry of Presidential Affairs is a department of the Syrian Government. The ministry assists the work of the President of Syria.

List of ministers 

 Mansour Fadlallah Azzam

References 
Cabinet of Syria
Government ministers of Syria
Government ministries of Syria
Presidents of Syria